Renu Gora is an Indian amateur boxer.

Gora fought in the 80 kg category and won Bronze medal in 2006 Women's World Amateur Boxing Championships. Been part of India's first Women's Amateur Boxing championship.

References 

Place of birth missing (living people)
Year of birth missing (living people)
Living people
Indian women boxers
Light-heavyweight boxers